Yakhrenga is a rural locality (a settlement) in Kadnikovskoye Rural Settlement, Vozhegodsky District, Vologda Oblast, Russia. The population was 288 as of 2002. There are 8 streets.

Geography 
Yakhrenga is located 25 km southwest of Vozhega (the district's administrative centre) by road. Vozhega is the nearest rural locality.

References 

Rural localities in Vozhegodsky District